The Feroz Awards are Spain-based film and television awards presented by the Asociación de Informadores Cinematográficos de España (Association of Cinematographic Informers of Spain). They are considered the Spanish equivalent to the Golden Globe Awards, since they are part of the build-up to the Goya Awards, presented by the Spanish Film Academy. Created as film awards, the first edition took place in January 2014. Categories recognizing excellence in television were added for the 4th edition that took place in 2017.

Eligibility conditions
To be eligible for Premios Feroz, a film needs to have been premiered within the year prior to the award ceremony and, before the premiere, have been featured in a special projection for the press in Madrid, Barcelona or both. If this last condition did not happen, the film should have been made available (also before the official premiere) for online viewing to the members of Asociación de Informadores.

Categories

Film
 Best Drama Film
 Best Comedy Film
 Best Director
 Best Main Actor in a Film
 Best Main Actress in a Film
 Best Supporting Actor in a Film
 Best Supporting Actress in a Film
 Best Screenplay
 Best Original Soundtrack
 Best Trailer

Best Film Poster

Premio Feroz Especial 
Premio Feroz Especial is awarded to Spanish films that members of Asociación de Informadores Cinematográficos de España consider deserved better commercial results. Until the 5th edition of the awards, it was a non competitive category; nominations were introduced for the 5th edition.

Best Documentary Film

Television
 Feroz Award for Best Drama Series
 Feroz Award for Best Comedy Series

Best Main Actor in a TV Series

Best Main Actress in a TV Series

Best Supporting Actor in a TV Series

Best Supporting Actress in a TV Series

Best Screenplay in a Series

Feroz de Honor (Honorary Award)

Ceremonies

See also
Goya Awards

References

 
Awards established in 2014
2014 establishments in Spain